Maria Erika Olofsdotter Aittamaa (22 February 1866 – 15 December 1952) was a Swedish artisan of Tornedalian descent, famed as the inventor of the Lovikkavante mitten.

Aittamaa was born to a poor family with many children. A part of the Finnic Meänkieli-speaking population of the Norrbotten County in northern Sweden, she lived in Lovikka with her husband and children and started to sell mittens to make money. In 1892 she invented the Lovikkavante, a special kind of mittens. Demand for Erika's mittens became so great that she taught others how to make them. During the 1930s a local teacher found that she could patent the design. The process however cost money and although the teacher found people who would fund the cost, Aittamaa refused to take charity.

References

Further reading
 

19th-century Swedish businesspeople
20th-century Swedish businesspeople
1866 births
1952 deaths
Gloves
Swedish fashion designers
Swedish women fashion designers
Tornedalians
20th-century Swedish businesswomen
19th-century Swedish businesswomen